Sigela penumbrata, the stippled sigela moth, is a species of moth in the family Erebidae. The species is found in North America, including Tennessee and Florida.

The wingspan is about 11 mm.

External links
 Bug Guide
 Images
 The Florida Entomologist

Scolecocampinae